Staro Baldovci is a village in the municipality of Bosilovo, North Macedonia.

Demographics
As of the 2021 census, Staro Baldovci had 422 residents with the following ethnic composition:
Turks 222
Persons for whom data are taken from administrative sources 109
Macedonians 90
Roma 1

According to the 2002 census, the village had a total of 269 inhabitants. Ethnic groups in the village include:
Macedonians 116
Turks 124
Romani 5
Others 24

References

External links
 Visit Macedonia

Villages in Bosilovo Municipality